Fish Creek–Lacombe station is a CTrain light rail station in Shawnee Slopes, Calgary, Alberta which opened October 9, 2001 as part of the South LRT Extension Phase I and was the southern terminus until June 27, 2004. It serves the South Line (Route 201). It is located on the exclusive LRT right of way (adjacent to CPR ROW), 14.2 km south of the City Hall interlocking. The station is west of MacLeod Trail and just to the north of James McKevitt Road.

The station has a center-loading platform with barrier-free access at both ends. The North end connects to the heated indoor ticket pavilion and the bus loop. The south end connects to the park-and-ride lot as well as the pedestrian overpass that connects Fish Creek Provincial Park and Midnapore to the LRT station. A large 1130 space park-and-ride lot is located on site.

The station platform was originally constructed to 3-car length with room set aside to easily expand to 4-car length when needed in the future.  Construction on a Southern extension of the platform started on July 16, 2012, and the new platform extension and relocated track crossing opened on December 15, 2012.

In 2005, the station registered an average of 6,200 boardings per weekday.

References

CTrain stations
2001 establishments in Alberta
Railway stations in Canada opened in 2001